Barend van Hemert (10 May 1891 – January 1945) was a Dutch male footballer. He was part of the Netherlands national football team, playing 1 match on 17 May 1914.

Personal life
Van Hemert also had reputation as an all-round sportsman, being an able swimmer, boxer and shot putter. He used his boxing skills helpfully while attending (not playing) a Netherlands versus Germany international football match at Leipzig in 1912, when he intervened to help extricate the Austrian referee from German supporters who had invaded the pitch protesting the referee's decision against a German player. In 1922, he set a Dutch national record for shot put by throwing it 12.21 metres.

Van Hemert was professionally a leather goods merchant in Dordrecht whose business was ruined in the economic depression of the 1930s.

During World War II, following the occupation of his country by Nazi Germany in 1940, Van Hemert, despite his relatively late age, enlisted in the Wehrmacht and served on the Eastern Front. He lost his life, aged 53, during January 1945 in the Warsaw area of Poland.

See also
 List of Dutch international footballers

References

1891 births
1945 deaths
Dutch footballers
Dutch male shot putters
Netherlands international footballers
Footballers from Dordrecht
Association footballers not categorized by position
German military personnel killed in World War II